Amelia Earhart Airport  is a city-owned airport two miles west of Atchison, in Atchison County, Kansas, United States. It is named for Atchison native Amelia Earhart.

Facilities

In the year ending March 31, 2006 the airport had 16,100 general aviation aircraft operations, average 44 per day. 25 aircraft were then based at the airport: 92% single-engine and 8% multi-engine.

References

External links

Airports in Kansas
Buildings and structures in Atchison County, Kansas